"Besándote" is a song by Colombian band Piso 21, from their second studio album Ubuntu (2018). It was released on 21 April 2017 by the Mexican division of Warner Music Group as the album's second single. On 1 September 2017, a remix featuring English singer Anne-Marie was released.  The official lyric video for the remix was released on August 31, 2017 on Piso 21's YouTube account.

Music video 
The music video for "Besándote" premiered on 20 April 2017 on Piso 21's YouTube account. Recorded in Mar del Plata, Argentina, it was directed by David Bohórquez and has been viewed over 100 million times.

Track listing

Charts

Year-end charts

Certifications

References

External links

2017 songs
2017 singles
Spanish-language songs
Warner Music Mexico singles
Piso 21 songs